Joel Senior (born 7 December 1987) is a Jamaican former professional footballer who played as an attacking midfielder.

Club career

College and Amateur
Senior moved from his native Jamaica to the Washington D.C. area as a child. He attended Archbishop Carroll High School, where he was the Washington Catholic Athletic Conference Player of the Year as a junior and senior and the Gatorade Player of the Year for Washington, D.C., as a senior.

Senior played two years of college soccer for Howard Bison at Howard University, moving to James Madison University and James Madison Dukes prior to his junior year. He won JMU's Justin Armitage/Michael J. Frye Memorial Award in 2008, and was named to the All-CAA conference third team as a senior in 2009.

During his college years Senior also played for Delaware Dynasty in the USL Premier Development League.

Professional
Senior turned professional in 2010 when he signed to play for the Real Maryland Monarchs in the USL Second Division. He made his professional on 22 May 2010 in a game against the Charlotte Eagles. In 2011, Senior signed with Harbour View F.C. in the National Premiere League.

International career
Senior played for the Jamaica U20 national team in the final round of CONCACAF Under-20 Tournament in 2007. He was subsequently called into the senior national team training camp in spring 2008, He made his debut for the side against  Cuba in a Friendly on 22 February 2012.

References

External links
Real Maryland Monarchs bio
JMU bio

1987 births
Living people
Howard Bison men's soccer players
Jamaican footballers
Association football midfielders
Jamaica international footballers
National Premier League players
USL League Two players
USL Second Division players
 players
Delaware Dynasty players
James Madison Dukes men's soccer players
Real Maryland F.C. players
Harbour View F.C. players
Jamaican expatriate footballers
Jamaican expatriate sportspeople in the United States
Expatriate soccer players in the United States